Carla Barbarino was born on 16 May, 1967 in Lodi, Italy. She is an Italian former sprinter (400 m) and hurdler (400 m hs).

Biography
She won the national championships four times. She has been the coach of Italian hurdler Manuela Gentili since 2004.

National records
 4x400 metres relay indoor: 3'35"01 ( Ghent, 27 February 2000) - with Virna De Angeli, Francesca Carbone, Patrizia Spuri

Achievements

National titles
2 wins in 400 metres hurdles at the Italian Athletics Championships (1989, 1996)
2 wins in 400 metres at the Italian Athletics Indoor Championships (1994, 1998)

See also
Italian all-time top lists - 400 metres hurdles

References

External links
 

1967 births
Italian female sprinters
Italian female hurdlers
Living people
Mediterranean Games gold medalists for Italy
Mediterranean Games bronze medalists for Italy
Athletes (track and field) at the 1997 Mediterranean Games
World Athletics Championships athletes for Italy
Mediterranean Games medalists in athletics
20th-century Italian women
21st-century Italian women